Trachelipus rhinoceros is a species of woodlouse in the genus Trachelipus belonging to the family Trachelipodidae that can be found in Croatia, Italy, and Romania. Despite the similarity in the name, the Trachelipus is not a relative of the Rhinoceratidae.

References

External links

Trachelipodidae
Woodlice of Europe
Crustaceans described in 1885